Jocelyn Scheirer is an American entrepreneur, scientist, and artist who has been working in wearable technology since the late 1990s. Her research focuses on Affective Computing, which she pursued while pursuing her PhD (pending) at MIT Media's Lab Affective Computing Group with Rosalind Picard. Scheirer invented and, along with MIT, patented the Galvactivator glove which measured skin conductance through sensors on the palm and relayed the varying intensity through an LED display.
She founded the intercommunication equipment and systems company Empathyx, Inc. in 2006 and co-founded the emotional analytics company Affectiva in 2009, serving as their director of operations until 2010.  Scheirer has also created several visual and performance art pieces that have been featured in several galleries in Massachusetts including the MIT Museum, the Galatea Fine Art Gallery, and the Bromfield Gallery. She currently serves as CEO of the wearable company Bionolux Labs, LLC.

Education and published works

Scheirer graduated from Concord Academy in Concord, Massachusetts in 1985. She obtained a Bachelor of Arts in Psychology and English Literature from Tufts University in 1989. She then went on to earn her master's degree from Brandeis University, focusing on Developmental and Social Psychology, graduating in 1996. Scheirer later pursued a PhD in media arts and sciences while working as a research assistant in the MIT Media Lab's Affective Computing Group from 1996 to 2001.

Career 

Shortly after graduating from Tufts University, Scheirer worked as a research technician under Arthur S. Tischler in the endocrine pathology lab at Tufts University School of Medicine from 1991 to 1994. She co-authored several works with Tischler concerning chromaffin cell proliferation in rats and humans. Two years later, Scheirer joined the MIT Media Lab as a research assistant in the Affective Computing Research Group and began developing affective objects, or physical objects that can record emotional data from a given subject and relay that information to that subject or to observers in a given environment. She published several studies on the topic with Rosalind Picard, the founder of the Affective Computing Research Group.

While at MIT Scheirer developed several affective objects with Picard including AboutFace, eyeglasses that can track changes facial movement characteristic of confusion and interest, Touch Phone, a telephone handset supplemented with pressure sensitive foam that changed the color of an icon on the recipient's screen, and the Galvactivator, a glove that measures skin conductance and relays the information via a glowing LED. Scheirer would continue to prototype the Galvactivator device in her future companies Empathyx, Inc. and Bionolux, LLC. Affectiva also licensed the patent in 2009.

Scheirer briefly worked as a consultant for Sherry Turkle in the Science, technology, and society department at MIT. conducting ethnographic research for Turkle's book Alone Together from 2000 to 2001.

In 2006, Scheirer founded her first MIT Media Lab spinout Empathyx, Inc. where she attempted to commercialize the Galvactivator. In 2009, Affectiva licensed the Galvactivator from MIT. Rana el Kaliouby and Rosalind Picard would continue to utilize the patent over the next 3 years, developing their own skin conductance sensor called the Q Sensor which also used some of the technology from the MIT Media Lab's iCalm, another wearable physiological monitoring device. Affectiva used the Q Sensor in addition to their facial recognition software to measure physiological stress and excitement in focus groups. Affectiva discontinued their use of the "Q Sensor" in 2013 to focus their attention exclusively on their patented Affdex facial recognition software.

Following her time at Affectiva, Scheirer briefly worked as a research analyst performing statistical analysis at the Harvard Graduate School of Education from 2011 to 2012 before starting her own technology company, Bionolux Labs, LLC.

Current work 

Scheirer founded the wearables research and development company Bionolux Labs, LLC in May 2014 and currently serves as CEO.  Bionolux Labs’ first  project is a patent-pending skin conductance ring.  The company currently collaborates with institutions including NASA, NYU, and Brandeis University where she is lecturer in psychology.[34]

She was elected to sit on the board of the MIT Enterprise Forum of New York City in September 2015.  She is also a Research Scholar at the Ronin Institute.

Relevant published work 

Below is a list of Scheirer's most notable published works in order of publishing date:

Patents 
"Sensing and Display of Skin Conductivity.” U.S. Patent 6415176. Issued July 2, 2002. (Jocelyn Scheirer, Rosalind Picard, Nancy Tilbury, and Jonathan Farringdon)

References

External links 
 Bionolux, LLC
 MIT Media Lab Affective Computing Group (Jocelyn Scheirer's Page)
 2015 Internet of Things Expo (Scheirer is speaking at this event)
 
 

1967 births
Living people
American women in business
Jewish scientists
Tufts University School of Arts and Sciences alumni
21st-century American women scientists
American women computer scientists
American computer scientists
Concord Academy alumni
Scientists from Baltimore
Brandeis University alumni